Henry Cameron Lyster (12 February 1862 – 30 July 1932)  was Dean of Ferns from 1926 until his death.

Lyster was educated  at Trinity College, Dublin and ordained in 1886.  After  curacies in Hillsborough, Downpatrick and Dublin he became the incumbent at Enniscorthy in 1895. He was  Treasurer of Ferns Cathedral from   1914 until his appointment as Dean.

Notes

1862 births
Alumni of Trinity College Dublin
Deans of Ferns
1932 deaths